Hai'an is a county-level city in Jiangsu, China.

Haian or Hai'an may also refer to:

 Hai'an Range, on the eastern shore of Taiwan 
 Hai'an Subdistrict, Jinping District, Shantou, Guangdong
 Hai'an, Chenjiagang, Xiangshui, Yancheng, Jiangsu
 Chinese frigate Hai-an